Lepicoleaceae is a family of liverworts belonging to the order Jungermanniales.

Genera:
 Lepicolea Dumort.
 Vetaforma Fulford & J.Taylor

References

Jungermanniales
Liverwort families